Zoran Kastratović (born 2 March 1966) is a Montenegrin handball coach and former player.

Career
In May 2011, it was announced that Kastratović agreed to terms to become the new head coach for Montenegro. He would lead the team at two major tournaments, before being dismissed in February 2014. During his time at the helm of Montenegro, Kastratović also served as head coach of Sutjeska Nikšić (August–November 2011) and Vardar (July–October 2013).

Personal life
Kastratović is married to fellow handball player Indira Kastratović (née Jakupović).

References

1966 births
Living people
People from Berane
Yugoslav male handball players
Montenegrin male handball players
Montenegrin handball coaches
Handball coaches of international teams
Montenegrin expatriate sportspeople in North Macedonia
Montenegrin expatriate sportspeople in Qatar
Montenegrin expatriate sportspeople in Iran